To Live, also titled Lifetimes in some English versions, is a 1994 Chinese drama film directed by Zhang Yimou and written by Lu Wei, based on the novel of the same name by Yu Hua. It is produced by the Shanghai Film Studio and ERA International, starring Ge You and Gong Li, in her 7th collaboration with director Zhang Yimou.

This film is about a couple, portrayed by Ge You and Gong Li, living through tumultuous periods of modern Chinese history, from the Chinese Civil War in the late 1940s to the Cultural Revolution. After going through enormous personal difficulties and tragedies, the couple tenaciously survives and endures, witnessing the vast changes of modern China.

By applying chronological narration to address the social practices of China's ideology, the film demonstrates the difficulties of the common Chinese, reflecting on how the government controls the nation as a collective community without considering their citizens.

The portrayal of the Chinese people living under social pressures create the meaning of the film, as their grinding experience shows their resistance and struggles under political changes.

To Live was screened at the 1994 New York Film Festival before eventually receiving a limited release in the United States on November 18, 1994. The film has been used in the United States as a support to teach Chinese history in high schools and colleges.

Having achieved international success with his previous films (Ju Dou and Raise the Red Lantern), director Zhang Yimou's To Live came with high expectations, and lived up to it, receiving critical acclaim. It is the first Chinese film that had its foreign distribution rights pre-sold. Furthermore, To Live brought home the Grand Prix, Prize of the Ecumenical Jury, and Best Actor Award (Ge You)  from the 1994 Cannes Film Festival, the highest major international awards Zhang Yimou has ever won.

The Film was denied a theatrical release in mainland China by the Chinese State Administration of Radio, Film, and Television due to its critical portrayal of various policies and campaigns of the government, such as the Great Leap Forward and the Cultural Revolution. However, the film has now been made available in China online, through various paid streaming websites (ex. iQIYI).

Plot 
In the 1940s, Xu Fugui (Ge You) is a rich man's son and compulsive gambler, who loses his family property to a man named Long'er. His behavior also causes his long-suffering wife Jiazhen (Gong Li) to leave him, along with their daughter, Fengxia, and their unborn son, Youqing.

Fugui eventually reunites with his wife and children but is forced to start a shadow puppet troupe with a partner named Chunsheng. The Chinese Civil War is occurring at the time, and both Fugui and Chunsheng are conscripted into the Kuomintang's Republic of China armed forces during a performance. Midway through the war, the two are captured by the communist People's Liberation Army and serve by performing their shadow puppet routine for the communist revolutionaries. After the Communist victory, Fugui is able to return home, only to find out that due to a week-long fever, Fengxia has become mute and partially deaf.

Soon after his return, Fugui learns that Long'er burned all his property just to deny the new regime from seizing it. No one helped put out the fire because Long'er was a gentry. He is eventually put on trial and sentenced to execution. As Long'er is pulled away, he recognizes Fugui in the crowd and tries to talk to him as he is dragged toward the execution grounds. Realizing that Long'er's fate would have been his if not for his "misfortune" years earlier, Fugui is filled with fear and runs into an alleyway before hearing five gunshots. He runs home to tell Jiazhen what has happened, and they quickly pull out the certificate stating that Fugui served in the communist People's Liberation Army. Jiazhen assures him they are no longer gentries and will not be killed.

The story moves forward a decade into the future, to the time of the Great Leap Forward. The local town chief enlists everyone to donate all scrap iron to the national drive to produce steel and make weaponry for retaking Taiwan. As an entertainer, Fugui performs for the entire town nightly, and is very smug about his singing abilities.

Soon after, some boys begin picking on Fengxia. Youqing decides to get back at one of the boys by dumping spicy noodles on his head during a communal lunch. Fugui is furious, but Jiazhen stops him and tells him why Youqing acted the way he did. Fugui realizes the love his children have for each other.

The children are exhausted from the hard labor they are doing in the town and try to sleep whenever they can. They eventually get a break during the festivities for meeting the scrap metal quota. The entire village eats dumplings in celebration. In the midst of the family eating, schoolmates of Youqing call for him to come prepare for the District Chief. Jiazhen tries to make Fugui let him sleep but eventually relents and packs her son twenty dumplings for lunch. Fugui carries his son to the school, and tells him to heat the dumplings before eating them, as he will get sick if he eats cold dumplings. He must listen to his father to have a good life.

Later on in the day, the older men and students rush to tell Fugui that his son has been killed by the District Chief. He was sleeping on the other side of a wall that the Chief's Jeep was on, and the car ran into the wall, injuring the Chief and crushing Youqing. Jiazhen, in hysterics, is forbidden to see her son's dead body, and Fugui screams at his son to wake up. Fengxia is silent in the background.

The District Chief visits the family at the grave, only to be revealed as Chunsheng. His attempts to apologize and compensate the family are rejected, particularly by Jiazhen, who tells him he owes her family a life. He returns to his Jeep in a haze, only to see his guard beating Fengxia for breaking the Jeep's windows. He tells the guard to stop, and walks home.

The story moves forward again another decade, to the Cultural Revolution. The village chief advises Fugui's family to burn their puppet drama props, which have been deemed as counter-revolutionary. Fengxia carries out the act, and is oblivious to the Chief's real reason for coming: to discuss a suitor for her. Fengxia is now grown up and her family arranges for her to meet Wan Erxi, a local leader of the Red Guards. Erxi, a man crippled by a workplace accident, fixes her parents' roof and paints depictions of Mao Zedong on their walls with his workmates. He proves to be a kind, gentle man; he and Fengxia fall in love and marry, and she soon becomes pregnant.

Chunsheng, still in the government, visits immediately after the wedding to ask for Jiazhen's forgiveness, but she refuses to acknowledge him. Later, he is branded a reactionary and a capitalist. He comes to tell them his wife has committed suicide and he intends to as well. He has come to give them all his money. Fugui refuses to take it. However, as Chunsheng leaves, Jiazhen commands him to live, reminding him that he still owes them a life.

Months later, during Fengxia's childbirth, her parents and husband accompany her to the county hospital. All doctors have been sent to do hard labor for being over educated, and the students are left as the only ones in charge. Wan Erxi manages to find a doctor to oversee the birth, removing him from confinement, but he is very weak from starvation. Fugui purchases seven steamed buns (mantou) for him and the family decides to name the son Mantou, after the buns. However, Fengxia begins to hemorrhage, and the nurses panic, admitting that they do not know what to do. The family and nurses seek the advice of the doctor, but find that he has overeaten and is semiconscious. The family is helpless, and Fengxia dies from postpartum hemorrhage (severe blood loss). The point is made that the doctor ate 7 buns, but that by drinking too much water at the same time, each bun expanded to the size of 7 buns: therefore Fengxia's death is a result of the doctor's having the equivalent of 49 buns in his belly.

The movie ends six years later, with the family now consisting of Fugui, Jiazhen, their son-in-law Erxi, and grandson Mantou. The family visits the graves of Youqing and Fengxia, where Jiazhen, as per tradition, leaves dumplings for her son. Erxi buys a box full of young chicks for his son, which they decide to keep in the chest formerly used for the shadow puppet props. When Mantou inquires how long it will take for the chicks to grow up, Fugui's response is a more tempered version of something he said earlier in the film. He expresses optimism for his grandson's future, and the film ends with his statement, "and life will get better and better" as the whole family sits down to eat.

Cast
 Ge You as Xu Fugui (t, s, Xú Fúguì, lit."Lucky & Rich"):
Fugui came from a rich family, but he is addicted to gambling, so his pregnant wife walked away from him with their daughter. After he gambled away all his possessions, his father passed away due to anger. After a year, his wife came back and they started their life over again. Fugui and Chunsheng together maintained a shadow puppet business for their livelihood, but they were forcibly conscripted by the Kuomintang army, and later the Communist Party. When at last, Fugui got home after the war, everything has changed.
 Gong Li as Jiazhen (Jiāzhēn, lit."Precious Family"), Fugui's wife:
Jiazhen is a hard-working, kind, and virtuous woman. She is a strong spiritual pillar for Fugui. When her husband gambled his possessions away, Jiazhen angrily left him and took their daughter away. But when Fugui had lost everything, and she knew that Fugui had completely quit gambling, she returned to his side to share in weal and woe. She was not after a great fortune, just a peaceful life with her family.
 Liu Tianchi as adult Xu Fengxia (t, s, Xú Fèngxiá, lit."Phoenix & Rosy Clouds"), daughter of Fugui and Jiazhen
 Xiao Cong as teenage Xu Fengxia;
 Zhang Lu as child Xu Fengxia;
When Fengxia was a child, she had a serious fever and could not be cured in time, so she became deaf. She married Erxi after she grew up, but when she gave birth, she died for lack of professional doctors.
 Fei Deng as Xu Youqing (t, s, Xú Yǒuqìng, lit."Full of Celebration"), Fugui and Jiazhen's son:
Youqing was accidentally hit and killed by Chunsheng due to drowsy driving during the Great Leap Forward.
 Jiang Wu as Wan Erxi (t, s, Wàn Èrxǐ, lit."Double Happiness"), Fengxia's husband:
Erxi is honest, kind, and loyal. He often took care of Fengxia’s parents after Fengxia’s death. 
 Ni Dahong as Long'er (t, s, Lóng'èr lit."Dragon the Second"):
Long'er used to be the head of a shadow puppet troupe and won all of Fu Gui's property by gambling. After liberation, he was classified as a landlord and his property was ordered to be confiscated. But he refused the confiscation, and set the property on fire. As a result, he was convicted of the crime of "counterrevolutionary sabotage" and sentenced to death by shooting.
 Guo Tao as Chunsheng (Chūnshēng, lit."Spring-born"):
Fugui's good friend, they served together as forced conscripts. Chunsheng then joined the People's Liberation Army, and became the district governor. Due to this position, he was criticized as a capitalist roader and endured struggle sessions during the Cultural Revolution.

Production

Development
Zhang Yimou originally intended to adapt Mistake at River's Edge, a thriller written by Yu Hua. Yu gave Zhang a set of all of the works that had been published at that point so Zhang could understand his works. Zhang said when he began reading To Live, one of the works, he was unable to stop reading it. Zhang met with Yu to discuss the script for Mistake at River's Edge, but they kept bringing up To Live. Thus, the two decided to adapt To Live instead.

Casting 
Ge You, known for his comedic roles, was chosen by Zhang Yimou to play the title character, Fugui. Known for poker-faced comedy, he was not accustomed to expressing emotional states this character requires. Thus, he was not very confident in himself, even protesting going to the Cannes Film Festival where he would eventually garner a best actor award.

Director 
Growing up, Zhang spent his youth years through the Cultural revolution. Having personally experienced what it was like in such a time and setting, he had a very strong understanding and emotional connection with Chinese culture and society.

As a student who studied screen studies in university in the country’s capital city, he and his peers were heavily exposed to various movies from across the world and across time. His classmate, who is now the President of the Beijing Film Academy stated that during their four years in university, they went through over 500 films spanning from Hollywood films from the 1930s to Italian Neo-Realism films. Zhang Yimou stated in a previous interview that even after many years, he still remembered the culture shock he experienced when first exposed to the wide variety of films.

The combination of the two very crucial parts of his life provided him with a very strong vision for his films. He was able to have a very strong understanding of both the Chinese national outlook as well as the international outlook of films and applied them extensively throughout his career.

Zhang described that To Live is the film he felt the strongest connection to because of the Cultural Revolution background in the film. The political background of Zhang’s family was the label “double-counterrevolutionary”, which was the worst kind of counterrevolutionary. Different from other fifth-generation filmmakers such as Chen Kaige and Tian Zhuangzhuang, Zhang was in a desperate state and cannot trace back things that were lost during the Cultural Revolution.  Zhang said “For me, that was an era without hope – I lived in a world of desperation”.

Zhang, in an interview, described how he used different elements that diverged from the original novel. The use of the shadow play and puppet theatre was to emphasize a different visual look. The ending of the film To Live is different from the novel’s because Zhang wanted to pass the censorship in China and gain approval from the audience in mainland China, even though the film has not been publicly screened in China yet. On the other hand, Zhang’s family had suffered enormously during the Cultural Revolution, but, as Zhang stated, they still survived. Thus, he felt that the book’s ending where everyone in Fu Gui’s family had died was not as reasonable. Furthermore, Zhang Yimou chose Ge You, who is famous for his comedic roles to play the protagonist, Fu Gui. Ge You actually inspired Zhang to add more humorous elements in the film, therefore it is more reasonable not to kill every character at the end.

Differences from the novel 

 Moved the setting from rural southern China to a small city in northern China.
Added elements of shadow puppetry.
A symbol of wealth. Shows that it is at the mercy of others and can do nothing about its own future.
Second narrator and the ox not present in the film.
Fugui had a sense of political idealism that he lost by the end of the film.
 The novel is a retrospective, but Zhang adapts the film without the remembrance tone.
Zhang introduced the elimination of Yu Hua's first person narration 
Only Fugui survived in the novel, but Fugui, Jiazhen, Erxi, and Mantou all survived in the film.

Adaptation 
In the film “To Live”, Zhang Yimou did not choose to directly express the theme of the novel, but to reduce the number of deaths, change the way of death, and cut into the doomed sense of fate to eliminate the audience's immediate depression brought by the story itself. In the film, these deliberately set dramatic turns highlight the theme that those infinitely small people, as living “others”, can only rely on living instinct to bear suffering in history, times and social torrents. The theme of the novel- the ability to bear suffering and the optimistic attitude to the world- is hidden in these little people who are helpless to their own fate but still alive strongly.

As a film art that can restore extreme reality and stimulate the audience’s audio-visual sense to the greatest extent, if it still follows the original “death fable” style of telling, it will undoubtedly be depressing and dark, which will have a certain negative impact on the audience. Therefore, it is a feasible strategy for Zhang Yimou’s film adaptation to implement moderate deviation and elimination of suffering in order to weaken the excessive impact of film art communication. According to his personal experiences, Zhang Yimou blended the story into historical background and used a more gentle technique to highlight the helplessness of the character’s fate under the influence of the time. It indirectly expresses the main idea of the novel and weakens the feeling of suffocating, which makes it an excellent adaptation film with “Zhang’s brand”. This work not only tries to restore the original, but also joins another creative subject: the director’s thinking and independent consciousness. The added shadow puppets and innovative changes to the ending, to certain extent, achieved the film because the main thrust of the novel is shown in these innovations. The translation of text into a new film language, although with a strong Zhang’s brand, ensures the original spiritual connotation. The film “To Live” has also become a successful attempt of comprehensive transformation from literature art to film art.

Release

Limited release in North America 
The film opened on September 16, 1994 in Canada. By the time the film opened in the United States on November 18, the film had grossed $67,408. On November 18, it expanded to 4 theaters, including Angelika Film Center and Lincoln Plaza in New York City, where it grossed $32,902, towards a weekend gross of $34,647. It went on to gross $2.3 million in the United States and Canada.

Chinese censorship 
This film was banned in China due to a combination of factors. First, it has a critical portrayal of various policies and campaigns of the Communist Government. Such as how the protagonists’ tragedies were caused as a result of the Great Leap Forward and the Cultural Revolution. Second, Zhang Yimou and his sponsors entered the film at the Cannes Film Festival without the usual government’s permission, ruffling the feathers of the party. Lastly, this film suffered from the bad timing of its release, following Farewell My Concubine and The Blue Kite, films which cover almost the same subject matter and historical period. Both of these films had alerted the Chinese government due to their similar critical portrayals of Chinese policies, and made them very cautious and aware of the need to ban any future films that tried to touch on the same topics.

Despite being officially banned, the film was widely available on video in China upon its release and was even shown in some theaters.

Reception

Critical response 
To Live received critical acclaim and various critics selected the film in their year end lists.

There is, among film critics, almost a consensus that To Live is not merely a lament of difficult times, nor a critique of the evils of the totalitarian system, but more “an homage to the characters’ resilience and heroism in their odyssey of survival.” Some scholars further argue that the era’s hostile and chaotic environment is not the story itself, but simply serves as a stage for the story.

Accolades

Year-end lists 

 4th - Kevin Thomas, Los Angeles Times.
 5th - Janet Maslin, The New York Times
 5th - James Berardinelli, ReelViews 
 9th - Michael MacCambridge, Austin American-Statesman
 Honourable mention - Mike Clark, USA Today
 Honourable mention - Betsy Pickle, Knoxville News-Sentinel

Awards and nominations

Other accolades 

 Time Out 100 Best Chinese Mainland Films - #8 
 Included in The New York Times' list of The Best 1000 Movies Ever Made in 2004 
 included in CNN's list of 18 Best Asian Movie of All Time in 2008 
 The film ranked 41st in BBC's 2018 list of The 100 greatest foreign language films voted by 109 film critics from 43 countries around the world.

Symbolism

Food 

 Dumplings: Youqing’s lunch box with dumplings inside was never opened. These dumplings reappeared as an offering on Youqing’s tomb repeatedly. Rather than being eaten and absorbed, the dumplings are now lumps of dough and meat standing as reminders of a life that has been irreparably wasted.
 Mantou (steamed wheat bun): When Fengxia is giving birth, Doctor Wang, the only qualified doctor, passed out due to eating too many buns after a long time of hunger. Thus, he was unable to save Fengxia’s life. The mantou, meant to ease his hunger, rehydrated and expanded within his stomach, shrunken with starvation. “Filling stomach” ironically leads to the death of Fengxia. The buns did not save a life - it is an indirect killer of Fengxia.
 Noodles: Youqing used his meal as revenge for his sister. Although wasted in a literal sense, they are not wasted in Youqing’s mind. Food is not merely for “filling stomach” or “to live,” similarly, “to live” does not depend solely on foods.

Shadow puppetry 
The usage of shadow puppetry, which carries a historical and cultural heritage, throughout the movie acts as a parallel to what characters experience in the events that they have to live through.

Recurring lines 
In two places of the film, there is a similar line. The version that appears earlier in the film is: “The little chickens will grow to be ducks, the ducks will become geese, and the geese will become oxen, and tomorrow will be better because of communism.” The version that appears later in the film is: “The little chickens will grow to be ducks, the ducks will become geese, and the geese will become oxen, and tomorrow will be better.” This line acts as a picture of the Chinese people’s perseverance in the face of historical hardships, giving the feeling of hope for the audience.

Other facts 

 Referential meaning of the film: The scene in which the father publicly punishes the son in To Live can be read as a miniaturized re-rendering of the dramatic punishing scene watched by the entire world in June 1989, the Tiananmen Massacre.
There is a scene that the local town chief calls on everyone to donate the iron products of the family to make steel. This implies the historical time jumps to the Great Leap Forward. At that period of time, the Communist Party tried to copy the huge success of the industrial revolution in Britain. However, the method is wrong and wasn't helpful. It shows that when the flood of time come upon a single family, they have no choice but to be carried forward.
In the film To Live, during its second half, another tragedy occurred to Fugui's family - Fengxia died of childbirth. None of the nurses knew how to treat postpartum hemorrhage. It's worth noting that the nurses are saying: "We don't know how to deal with this! We are just students!"As the most qualified doctor is almost beaten to death. This section of the film suggests the suffering that the Cultural Revolution brought to people. Most doctors were replaced by Red Guards and were accused as reactionaries. As the sign on the doctor's body shows, he was in many struggle sessions with the Red Guard.

See also 
 List of films banned in China
 Censorship in the People's Republic of China
 List of Chinese films
 List of films featuring the deaf and hard of hearing

Bibliography

Further reading
 Giskin, Howard and Bettye S. Walsh. An Introduction to Chinese Culture Through the Family. SUNY Press, 2001. , .
 Xiao, Zhiwei. "Reviewed work(s): The Wooden Man's Bride by Ying-Hsiang Wang; Yu Shi; Li Xudong; Huang Jianxin; Yang Zhengguang Farewell My Concubine by Feng Hsu; Chen Kaige; Lillian Lee; Wei Lu The Blue Kite by Tian Zhuangzhuang To Live by Zhang Yimou; Yu Hua; Wei Lu; Fusheng Chin; Funhong Kow; Christophe Tseng." The American Historical Review. Vol. 100, No. 4 (Oct. 1995), pp. 1212–1215
 Chow, Rey. "We Endure, Therefore We Are: Survival, Governance, and Zhang Yimou's To Live." South Atlantic Quarterly 95 (1996): 1039-1064.
 Shi, Liang. "The Daoist Cosmic Discourse in Zhang Yimou's "to Live"."] Film Criticism, vol. 24, no. 2, 1999, pp. 2–16.

External links 
 
 
 
 

1994 films
Mandarin-language films
1994 drama films
History of China on film
Films based on Chinese novels
Films directed by Zhang Yimou
Films set in the 1940s
Films set in the 1950s
Films set in the 1960s
Films about the Cultural Revolution
Best Foreign Language Film BAFTA Award winners
Chinese epic films
Shanghai Film Studio films
The Samuel Goldwyn Company films
Chinese drama films
Censored films
Cannes Grand Prix winners